Miss Venezuela 2019 was the 66th edition of the Miss Venezuela held on August 1, 2019, at the Estudio 5 de Venevisión in Caracas, Venezuela. At the end of the event, Miss Venezuela 2018, Isabella Rodríguez, crowned Thalía Olvino of Delta Amacuro as the winner. Thalia represented Venezuela at Miss Universe 2019 and made into Top 20, while Melissa Jiménez, from Zulia, who was crowned Miss International Venezuela 2019 by Mariem Velazco, Miss International 2018, competed at Miss International 2019 and made into Top 15.

Results 
Color key

Contestants 
Contestants from all 23 states and the Capital District of the country will compete for the title.

References

External links
Miss Venezuela Official Website

Miss Venezuela
2019 beauty pageants
2019 in Venezuela
August 2019 events in Venezuela